Siraj-ul-Haque is a Pakistani television director. He is best known for his works Parsa, Tum Mere Kya Ho, Roshan Sitara, Humnasheen and Bunty I Love You. His recent works include  Fitoor  as well as Raaz-e-Ulfat and Ramz-e-Ishq.

Filmography

Film
 Mohabbat Ki Aakhri Kahaani (2016)

Television

 Parsa
 Tum Mere Kya Ho
 Roshan Sitara
 Humnasheen
 Bunty I Love You 
 Noor-e-Zindagi
 Dil Banjaara
 Yeh Raha Dil
 Daldal
 Koi Chand Rakh
 Raaz-e-Ulfat
 Fitoor

Awards and nominations

References

External links
 

Living people
People from Karachi
Pakistani male television actors
Pakistani film directors
Year of birth missing (living people)